HMCS d'Iberville is a Canadian Forces Naval Reserve Division (NRD) located in Rimouski, Quebec. Dubbed a stone frigate, HMCS d'Iberville  is a land-based naval establishment for part-time sailors as well as a local recruitment centre for the Royal Canadian Navy (RCN). It is one of 24 naval reserve divisions located in major cities across Canada.

Namesake 
The name d'Iberville celebrates the name of Canadian sailor, explorer and founder of the French colony of La Louisiane, Pierre Le Moyne d'Iberville, who was born in Ville-Marie, New France.

History

The First HMCS d'Iberville (1952 to 1961)

The first HMCS d'Iberville was commissioned as a naval school in Quebec City, Quebec. Focused on increasing the presence of French Canadians, the first HMCS d'Iberville was in operation for nine years before being paid off in 1961.

The Second HMCS d'Iberville (1986 to Present) 
The current HMCS d'Iberville was authorized to stand up in 1986, and formally commissioned in 1987, operating out of temporary facilities until the unit's permanent facility was opened in Rimouski East in 1994.

References 

Royal Canadian Naval Reserve
Military units and formations of Canada in World War II